This is a list of characters from the Japanese visual novel, manga, and anime series Kanon. The protagonist of the story is Yuichi Aizawa, a seventeen-year-old man who has forgotten much of his past as a child. There are five heroines in the story, starting with Ayu Tsukimiya, who is the main heroine. Ayu is a short girl Yuichi's age that used to play with him when Yuichi was younger. She carries a winged-backpack on her back, loves to eat taiyaki, and often says her trademark Ugū catchphrase. Next is Nayuki Minase, Yuichi's cousin, who is also in his class at school. Nayuki has the problem with sleeping in, and is very hard to get up in the morning. She has had a crush on Yuichi ever since she was a child. The third heroine is Makoto Sawatari, the youngest of the five heroines, who has lost nearly all of her memories. What she does remember is her own name, and that she holds a grudge against Yuichi for something he did in the past, though not even Yuichi can remember what he did. Shiori Misaka is the fourth heroine; she is a first year in high school, though never attends class due to an illness she has had since birth. She is usually a cheerful girl who wants her sister to acknowledge her most of all. The last heroine is named Mai Kawasumi, a silent girl who initially comes off as cold towards Yuichi and others, so in effect does not have many friends. She spends her nights at the school slaying demons.

Supporting characters in the story help to further along the plot of the five heroines. They include Akiko Minase, Nayuki's mother and Yuichi's aunt, who is very easy going and will approve of things in one second. Sayuri Kurata is Mai's supporting character, and only friend other than Yuichi. She always tries to put on a smile to hide a depressing past. Kaori Misaka is another, who is Shiori's sister, though she does not admit this to be true when confronted about it. The last supporting character is Mishio Amano who has a major involvement in Makoto's story. She has a cold personality, and helps Yuichi to uncover Makoto's true identity.

Minor characters include Jun Kitagawa, one of Yuichi's classmates, who has some minor involvement in Mai's story; in the anime adaptions (though not the original game) he is depicted as being romantically interested in Kaori. Another character is Kuze, the student council president at Yuichi's school, who plays a role in Mai's story. The last minor character is a household cat named Piro, who instantly takes a liking to Makoto after it is first encountered.

Main characters

Voiced by: Atsushi Kisaichi (2002 anime), Tomokazu Sugita (2006 anime/PSP game), Miwa Yasuda (Young Yuichi, Japanese), Chris Patton (English), Shannon Emerick (Young Yuichi, English)
Yuichi Aizawa is the protagonist of Kanon. He is friendly and outgoing. He constantly teases the main cast of girls throughout the story which varies in severity depending on the girl. Despite this, he does have a soft side that likens him to an older brother as noted by Shiori Misaka. He used to visit the city in which the story takes place, but his memories of that time are gone, slowly coming back to him as he interacts with the people he met in the past. As noted by himself, he is afraid of heights and not very fond of sweets. While not aware of it at first, Yuichi slowly begins to take notice in the supernatural events occurring within the city. During these times of revelation when he will discover something outrageous, he stays strong with the girls he has made close friendships with. Since Yuichi is a normal person, he tries to help them any way he can and will usually go out of his way in order to protect one or more of these girls.

Yuichi does not have a story behind his character. It was told that due to a family situation, it was decided that Yuichi would live in the Minase house from now on until he decided to move out and live on his own. When Kanon'''s story begins, Yuichi meets the five heroines and becomes intrinsically linked with each one of them as the story progresses. Yuichi's main purpose in the story is to be the one where the story revolves around as the protagonist and thus he becomes deeply rooted into each of the five main plot lines associated with each of the heroines. Yuichi attempts in each arc to stay with the respective girl until their arc has concluded. With Mai, Yuichi helped to fight off the demons, and with Makoto he stayed with her until she ultimately died. With Shiori, he indirectly prevented her from committing suicide, and with Nayuki, he remembers when Nayuki confessed to him 7 years ago with a snow bunny. He also tried to be there for her when her mother was in the hospital. Lastly, with Ayu, Yuichi tried to help her find her lost item, eventually finding it and repairing it with Nayuki's help.

Ayu is the main heroine in Kanon, followed closely by Nayuki Minase who is the only Kanon heroine to appear with Ayu on three of the official game covers released by Key. Ayu was created by Naoki Hisaya who wrote her scenario for the visual novel, and designed by Itaru Hinoue. Hisaya commented on how he thought Ayu was the one character in Kanon that he felt he grasped the best, but noted it was very difficult to write her character due to Ayu being primarily energetic. After Hinoue drew wings on Ayu's backpack, Hisaya suggested that they remove them due to spoiler reasons, and while Hinoue went along with it at the time, the wings were later included once again.

Yuichi meets a lively seventeen-year-old Ayu on the day after he moves to the city depicted in the game. As the story progresses, Yuichi discovers that she is trying to find something she lost, but she cannot remember what it is; Yuichi tries to help her in her search, but with no initial success. One of her most defining characteristics is the repeated utterance of her catch phrase  which she mutters as an expression of various negative emotions such as frustration, anger, and fear, something Yuichi enjoys teasing her about. Ayu refers to herself with the masculine pronoun —Japanese for "I", a rare occurrence among females. Her favorite food is taiyaki. She is seen eating the confection many times throughout Kanon. She can be a bit of an airhead, and despite looking younger than her age, she is the same age as Yuichi.

Seven years before the story begins, she fell out of a tree and hit her head on the last day Yuichi was going to be in town. At first, he believes she died, but Akiko reveals she is in the hospital and has been in a coma for the past seven years.  In an epilogue, she comes out of her coma, and gets her hair inadvertently cut too short when she goes to a barber shop, leading him to comment as he did before how much she looks like a boy.

Nayuki is Yuichi's cousin, with whom he moves in with at the beginning of the story. She has always been in love with him (in Japan, the marriages between first cousins are legal) and must learn how to deal with these feelings, especially with the threat that he may fall for one of the other girls. She adores strawberry sundaes, but the mere mention of her mother's "special" homemade jam makes her sick (or anyone else after trying it). Nayuki is a heavy sleeper, which has led her to collect dozens of alarm clocks; they do not work on her, but instead wake Yuichi every morning. Since she has such trouble waking up, she is always running for school and is in fact the school's star runner because of this. Similarly, she became the captain of the school's female track team despite being in her second year. She takes a long time to get up in the morning and will pass out several times in the morning, even while standing, before completely waking up. Despite her attempts to stay conscious, she still tends to fall asleep a lot in class, but Nayuki eventually was accepted into a top level university.

Nayuki has a fondness for animals and never misses an opportunity to try to pet one, even wild animals, such as cats, dogs, or even the occasional fox if she can help it. Unfortunately for her, she is allergic to cats. One of her defining features is that she tends to talk slower than the rest of the characters. She will often state the obvious to Yuichi, such as when lunch break occurs or when school ends. Also, when Yuichi breaks a promise with her, she often calls him a liar. Nayuki is second to Ayu as the most used character in the series' marketing. Also, in both anime adaptations, her story runs at the same time as Ayu's. In the anime and manga, it is revealed that Nayuki confessed to Yuichi shortly after Ayu's accident and was rejected because he still distraught over it.

Nayuki is the first girl to appear in Kanons story. Nayuki's arc revolves around her mother falling victim to a traffic accident and being hospitalized as a result. This causes Nayuki to fall into depression and Yuichi tries to console her despite Nayuki's continued efforts to push him away. In the original version of the visual novel, this was the point in her story where Nayuki's H-scene could be viewed. Nayuki eventually comes out of her depression and makes up with Yuichi. If the player follows the correct choices in following Nayuki's arc, her "good ending" takes place while Nayuki is still depressed. Yuichi ends up confessing to Nayuki, saying that he does not see her as a cousin, but as a very important girl. However, Nayuki is deeply upset by the sudden confession and she asks why he did not come to meet her seven years ago. Later on, Nayuki is able to accept Yuichi's confession.

In the epilogue, it is revealed that Akiko has fully recovered and returned home from the hospital. Nayuki forgets to turn off her alarm clock and the player gets to hear the recorded message that Yuichi left for her:  "Nayuki, I can't make a miracle happen, but I can be by your side. I promise if you're in despair I will comfort you. At happy times, I will laugh with you. Even in winter, filled with snow; even in spring, when the sakura tree blooms; even in the quiet summer; even in fall, when the color of leaves change; and even if the snow starts to fall again. I will stay here. I will not go anywhere. Because I...I really like you."

Makoto is a young girl who suddenly attacks Yuichi Aizawa in the middle of town early on in the story, though so weakly he was able to defeat her by simply extending his arm out. She is carried back to the Minase household where she lives as a guest for the remainder of her story. Despite having lost her memories, she remembers her name and is sure that she holds a grudge against Yuichi from when he visited the city in the past. Makoto's amnesia, or memory loss, is much more severe than Yuichi or Ayu Tsukimiya's, but from an entirely different source. She feels sad that pets sometimes are abandoned when their owners cannot take care of them. Due to this attitude, it takes her a while to warm up to a stray cat she finds halfway through her story which Yuichi later names Piro. Makoto is shown to love Piro very much and often carries the cat around on her head. Like Ayu, she too has an idiosyncratic expression, which she says when she is frustrated or sad; likewise, it has no real meaning. Near the end of her story, Makoto starts to wear two bells around her right wrist and enjoys the sound they make.

From early on, it is obvious that Makoto has a mischievous personality, which leads to her perform various pranks. Yuichi is the exclusive target of the pranks because of her strong dislike for him, something she constantly reaffirms. The pranks vary in severity, from simply dropping food on him to once throwing lit firecrackers into his room. However, he manages to turn each prank back on her, which makes her all the more determined to successfully prank him. As time passes and Makoto begins to feel more as a member of the Minase family rather than a stranger, she honestly grows to like Yuichi, effectively looking beyond her latent distaste for him. Soon after her attitude change, she starts weakening and eventually becomes incapable of communication because her wish to be at Yuichi's side can only last for a short period of time. Makoto falls in love with Yuichi and says she wants to be married to him and stay with him forever. At the end of her story, after she and Yuichi have been "married", she disappears in front of Yuichi, and is presumed to have died.

Makoto is in fact not a human being but instead a fox that Yuichi found ten years prior to the beginning of Kanon. Yuichi found Makoto, then a young fox, injured on Monomi Hill and he took her home to treat the injury and kept her in his room for the rest of the summer. One day, Yuichi told the fox about an older girl that he had a crush on named Makoto Sawatari, which is where present day Makoto takes her name. At the end of summer break, Yuichi took the fox back to the hill and ran home soon after releasing her, leading her to be angry with Yuichi. The two are reunited when the fox transforms into Makoto near the start of Kanon. With her desire to see Yuichi again being so strong, her wish was granted at the cost of her memories and later, her life.

 (Dreamcast and PlayStation 2 games), Akemi Satō (anime/PSP game), Maggie Flecknoe (English)
Shiori is a first-year student who has suffered from an illness since birth. Her affliction has caused her to be very physically weak, and she is almost always absent from school because of it. She loves drama and is always inventing reasons for things that happen in her life, but the real-life drama of a sister who denies her and a life threatened by illness is encroaching on her. Sick as she is, Shiori thinks nothing of sitting outside the school for hours on end while eating ice cream in the middle of winter, despite Yuichi telling her several times to go home and rest. Due to her illness, it is not strange for her to carry around an array of different pills and drugs for her many symptoms. She has a noticeably quiet voice. Shiori informs Yuichi early on that the reason she disobeys her doctors' advice and comes to school so frequently is that she wants to meet someone she knows. She is the only heroine in Kanon whom Yuichi did not meet in the past.

Shiori's first appearance in the Kanon story is the day after Yuichi arrives in town. The next day in school, Yuichi meets Shiori at school and he asks her what she is doing there. Shiori says not to worry since she is a student at the school, but has the day off due to sickness. When Yuichi asks what she is sick with, Shiori tells him it is a simple cold, though she has had it for a long time. During the next few weeks, Yuichi starts to meet with Shiori on a regular basis whether it is during or after school. Shiori ultimately confesses to having lied to Yuichi about how serious her sickness is, but does not go into much detail about it. Yuichi later finds out from a meeting with Shiori's older sister, Kaori Misaka, that Shiori may not live past her next birthday which is rapidly approaching.

A week before Shiori's birthday, she gets permission from her doctor to attend school for a week just like a normal student. Even after getting the chance to go to school for a week, Kaori still avoids Shiori as much as she can, not wanting to have to experience the pain that Shiori's death will bring. For Shiori's birthday, Yuichi decides to throw her a birthday party at a local café the day before her official birthday and invites several others to join. While Kaori does not show up at the start of the party, she later shows up which completely changes the mood of the party. Afterwards, Kaori finally decides to accept Shiori as her younger sister which makes Shiori happier than she had been in recent months.

Yuichi and Shiori spend the rest of the night at her favorite place in town: the very large fountain in the park. Shiori tells him that night something she neglected to say about the day they first met. That day, Shiori was planning to kill herself by slitting her wrists with a box cutter but after meeting Yuichi and Ayu on her way home from the grocery store, she could not go through with it and wanted to meet both of them again. After a kiss between the two, Shiori falls unconscious in Yuichi's arms; in the 2006 anime series, she leaves to get a drink and disappears. After this point, Shiori is taken back to the hospital and Kaori does not come to school during this time. At the end of the story, Shiori is miraculously cured. In tears, she confesses to Yuichi that she never wanted to die, and that she was only trying to be strong during those difficult times.

Mai is a third-year student of the same high school that Yuichi goes to. He meets her standing alone in the school building at night, with a sword in her hand. She has apparently taken it upon herself to fight and defeat demons at night while the school is deserted. Due to this, she is constantly blamed for accidents because she never denies them, being too sincere to say anything and knowing that no one will believe that there are demons in the school. Her best friend is Sayuri Kurata, the only person besides Yuichi that does not believe that Mai is a dangerous delinquent. Yuichi eventually starts bringing her dinner at the school while she is fighting and during these times Mai begins to warm up to Yuichi. Mai's idiosyncrasy is her unwillingness to carry on a conversation or even to merely utter the meekest of responses when addressed. Due to this, and her reputation as someone who causes trouble, she is most often avoided when at school, and is talked about behind her back. This cold side of her is shown to stem from having very little insight into other peoples' emotions.

Before Mai met Yuichi or even lived in Kanons city, Mai lived in a town with her mother who was admitted into the hospital with a serious illness. When her mother was close to death, Mai started to pray that her mother would recover and starts to cry. Miraculously, Mai's mother recovers somewhat by the morning and is soon cured of her sickness. The explanation of this stems from a magical power Mai has within herself. When she cries, her tears carry incredible healing powers which even have the power to bring things back from the dead. The media picked up on this, but Mai started to get bullied and terrorized as being a freak, so Mai and her mother moved to Kanon'''s city. Ten years prior to the beginning of Kanons story, Yuichi met Mai during summer break and the two of them played together for the rest of the summer, especially in a nearby barley field. When the summer break came to a close and Yuichi had to return home, Mai became very distraught at the thought of losing a very close friend so soon after meeting with him. Mai made up a story that demons started attacking the field of barley and that she needed his help to fight them off. Yuichi told her that he was sorry but he had no choice but to go back home. Mai told him that she would wait for his return some day. The story of demons attacking the barley field was actually true but misinterpreted. The "demons" were actually construction vehicles coming to raze the field in order to construct the new high school complex. Being the place where she met Yuichi, the field contains precious memories and is a place that she cherishes.

After starting to hang out with her in school, Yuichi discovers that Mai has a bad reputation at school due to the events involving the demons. Yuichi tries to improve her reputation by having her and Sayuri attend the annual school dance party, but a demon appears and makes matters worse; even attacking Sayuri. Yuichi starts training with Mai to help her fight against the demons and the two spend a night together at school fighting and destroying them. Unbeknownst to Yuichi, each time a demon has been killed, Mai has been hurt in the form of strange black marks appearing on her body. After an intense battle with the last remaining demons, Yuichi believes they have destroyed all of the demons, but is later confronted by another demon. He ultimately sees that it is not a demon, but rather a part of Mai's own power that shows him what happened before he met with Mai and what happened after they met ten years ago.

Due to Mai's incredible power to heal things, an adverse effect that she created from this power were the "demons". The reason that she was getting hurt after destroying them is because she was killing off parts of her own self. After Yuichi tries to tell her that it is all over now, Mai blames herself for causing her friends trouble and thus, stabs herself with the sword and is about to die. Just then, a fragment of Mai's own power materializes before Yuichi in the form of a young Mai and Yuichi reassures her that he will not leave Mai again. Mai's own power saves her and closes the wound she had just inflicted which saves Mai's life. Mai's power believes that now Mai will be able to accept this power that she has. Before Mai's power leaves sight, she asks Yuichi to call her by the name . Mai is later taken to the hospital where she shares a room with Sayuri and tells Yuichi that she will have to stay out of school until the spring. When spring comes, Mai is able to graduate high school with Sayuri.

Supporting characters

Akiko is Nayuki Minase's mother and Yuichi Aizawa's aunt whose main role is in Nayuki's story. She works at an unspecified job and takes care of the house, cooking various types of food, most of which is good except for her infamous "special" homemade jam which she alone enjoys the taste of. She appears to not realize exactly what is going on around her, taking in strays such as Makoto Sawatari and assuming lame excuses for her behavior. She may just realize that Makoto is a good person and can be cured of her anger, which is true. Akiko certainly exhibits more knowledge of the situation than Yuichi as far as the origins of Ayu Tsukimiya and Makoto are concerned, hinting that she is familiar with the supernatural goings-on in the town and how they apply to Yuichi. Akiko is very important to Nayuki since she does not have a father. Akiko is known to be very easy-going and is constantly smiling. She will not even resort to stern lectures, such as when Makoto spends money on herself that Akiko gave her to buy food. Akiko can be assertive, though she never has once raised her voice in anger or otherwise. She will often give responses to questions within one second of being asked, the answer almost always marking approval.

Akiko has some indirect involvement with Makoto Sawatari's and Ayu Tsukimiya's arcs. After Yuichi brought Makoto home for the first time, Akiko shows no intentions of throwing her out or handing her over to the police. She decided to house Makoto for the time being until they could find her parents or until she remembered something. With Ayu, Akiko asked her to stay at their house upon discovering that both of Ayu's parents were out of town. Akiko's main involvement is with her daughter Nayuki's arc. From when Nayuki was very young, Akiko raised her daughter alone; no information is given about Nayuki's father or what happened to him after Nayuki's birth. As such, Akiko and Nayuki are very close and never get in fights with each other. In Nayuki's story, Akiko gets critically injured in an indirect car accident which causes her to go into intensive care in the hospital. Nayuki, blaming herself because Akiko was out buying a small strawberry cake for her, goes into depression and pushes Yuichi away from her. Akiko is miraculously healed near the end of the story.

Kaori is mainly in Shiori's story, but is regularly seen due to her being Nayuki's best friend and Yuichi's and Nayuki's classmate, as well as the class representative. She is very smart and knows a lot about the schoolmates and townspeople, but doesn't appear to be aware of any of the supernatural things that happen, even after Yuichi's caring saves someone close to her. Her surname and appearance indicate that she is Shiori's sister, and Shiori affirms this, but Kaori vehemently denies it. Jun Kitagawa once commented how she started to act differently once they entered their second year in high school.

Kaori's main involvement in the story is during her younger sister Shiori's arc. When Yuichi starts to spend more time with Shiori away from school, Kaori asks Yuichi to meet one late night at school to tell him something. At their meeting, Kaori informs Yuichi that Shiori does not have very long left to live, and that by her next birthday, Shiori may die. Kaori tells him that the reason she does not want to get close with Shiori is that she does not want to feel the intense pain that will result from Shiori's death. Kaori breaks down after saying this, crying on Yuichi and lamenting the pointlessness of Shiori's birth.

After this point, Kaori starts to avoid Shiori even more than usual. When confronted by Yuichi about how she has been acting, Kaori tells him that she has no younger sister. For Shiori's birthday, Yuichi decides to throw a birthday party at a local café with several people invited including Ayu Tsukimiya, Nayuki Minase, Jun Kitagawa, and even Kaori herself among others. At the beginning of the party, Kaori is not there, though shows up later. The mood at the party instantly grows cold when Kaori arrives, as she still refuses to acknowledge her sister's existence despite the situation. After the party, however, Kaori finally accepts Shiori as her younger sister and as she is walking away to leave Yuichi and Shiori alone for the rest of the day, she tells Shiori that they should talk later to catch up on things. This rightfully so makes Shiori very happy, and she thanks Yuichi for all he has done. She manages to stay by Shiori's side after this even though the chances of her recovering are very slim. In the end, when Shiori does not die, Kaori does not change and continues to stay by her sister's side.

Sayuri is Mai Kawasumi's only friend before she meets Yuichi, and thus her biggest part is in Mai's story. She is the daughter of a wealthy family, and always tries to smile and help others. She uses more formal Japanese honorifics for Yuichi when she addresses him, even when they become close friends. Sayuri cares very deeply about Mai, as it shows since they not only hang out together constantly, but Sayuri will get worried if Mai is in trouble; she also never forgets Mai's birthday. Initially, she is completely ignorant about the demons but even though some begin to target her near the end of Mai's story, she stubbornly stays by Mai's side. Sayuri, as with Ayu and Makoto, has a cute quirk; when she laughs, she voices a distinct ahaha. Sayuri always addresses herself in the third person due to an event in her past.

Despite Sayuri being a supporting character, she gets some back story to explain some of her current situation and how she came to become such good friends with Mai. Sayuri had been raised strictly by her father, and when her younger brother Kazuya was born, Sayuri decided to be strict with him as her father had done with her. Kazuya himself was slow to develop and did not talk even after entering kindergarten; he hardly ever laughed. Kazuya was always alone; he had a weak body so Sayuri would walk him to and from kindergarten. Kazuya eventually becomes sicker with time and is admitted to the hospital. Shortly before Kazuya's death, Sayuri gives him candy and attempts to play with him for the first time in her life. After he died, Sayuri began to address herself in the third person. Sayuri explained that she could only see herself from a third-person point of view from then on; she did not smile either until after she met Mai. Sayuri believes that Mai saved her and has been a much larger help in her life than what Sayuri has been able to do for Mai since they met. In the anime, a scar is visible on Sayuri's left wrist for only a second before she covers it up after she tells of her past.

Sayuri's main involvement is during Mai's arc. Yuichi first meets her the day after he ran into Mai at the school at night for the first time. Sayuri asks Yuichi if he would like to have lunch with them, and Yuichi agrees. Upon discovering that Sayuri's food is very delicious, and because now Mai will have one more friend, Yuichi starts to eat lunch with the two third year girls every day for the rest of Mai's story. When Sayuri begins to notice that Yuichi and Mai are spending more time alone, Sayuri starts to suspect something is going on and tries to prove herself to Mai that she is able to help too. However, she ultimately gets seriously injured by the demons, but is able to fully recover. At the end of Mai's story, Sayuri graduates from high school with Mai.

There are some alternate endings related to Sayuri. There is a hidden option to get a "best end" with Sayuri—to do this the player needs to listen to Sayuri's backstory mentioned above, and if the player does so will later automatically choose to ask her out. The end of this storyline is a normal day except that Mai, Yuichi, and Sayuri are making a spectacle while eating lunch (Yuichi throwing food at Mai and Mai hitting him back) before the credits roll. One interpretation is that Sayuri is trying to move on from a less strict life.

Mishio is a key player near the end of Makoto Sawatari's story; she does not appear so much in this story as the other characters in this section. She mysteriously warns Yuichi to stay away from Makoto when Makoto's health begins to fail. That is because Mishio knows the mysterious and magical workings of the town, and she has experienced the loss that comes from asking for a miracle first hand. Due to this experience, she has shifted her personality and thus does not show much emotion or even smile, much like Mai. Mishio has shown herself to have a wild and girly imagination, as noted by Yuichi. She can immediately tell when someone is not normal or not even human.

Yuichi first meets Mishio the day after the incident where Makoto dropped Piro off a bridge. He had been trying to ask Mai how she knew that Makoto may be at Monomi Hill where he eventually found her, though Mai simply tells him that Mishio may be of some help. Mishio approaches him and gives him some subtle hints as to Makoto's true origins, though disappears before she can tell him much. A couple of days later, Yuichi introduces himself to Mishio and asks her if she would consider being Makoto's friend because she does not know many people and he thought that Mishio might be able to help her. Mishio vehemently rejects Yuichi's proposal, saying that she will never befriend Makoto. As the conversation goes on, Yuichi discovers that Mishio knows more than she is telling, though before she can tell him anymore, he stops her. A few days after that, Yuichi meets with Mishio again where she finally explains that Makoto is indeed not a human being. Mishio goes on to explain that Makoto's only reason for trading her memories and her life was to meet with Yuichi again, even if it would only be for a short time. She goes on to explain that Makoto does not have much longer to live and will begin to get weaker while hospitals or doctors will not be of any help. At the conclusion of their conversation, Mishio asks Yuichi not to pull her into the situation any longer.

Mishio's attitude towards Makoto's situation stems from a similar experience in her past much like the one Yuichi had to go through with Makoto. She simply does not want to feel the pain that she felt in the past over losing another loved one. Due to this event in Mishio's past, she stopped showing outward emotion and thus came off as a cold person henceforth. Although Mishio initially wanted not to get involved any further, Yuichi meets with Mishio a few more times over the course of Makoto's story to discuss how the situation is progressing. Near the end of Makoto's story, Mishio finally concedes to becoming friends with Makoto, though this is very short-lived as soon after Makoto dies.

Minor characters

Jun is a friend of Yuichi's who sits behind him in high school. Before long they even start making odd jokes, such as the fact that they always wear the same clothes to school due to the dress code. Viewers do not see a lot of him in the first anime adaptation. Jun has a crush on Kaori Misaka and will often follow her around despite Kaori's dismissal of his romantic affections. He is seemingly there for little more than character development, as well as being one of the male characters with a name.

Jun's main involvement in the story is in Mai Kawasumi's arc after the event at the ballroom dance. The student council president, Kuze, wanted to expel Mai from the school for what happened at the dance despite her not being the direct cause of the damages. Jun, who was on the council that organized the dance, makes it seem that he knew all along that Mai would put on her "show" for the other students, though had no idea that it would get out of hand. This puts most of the blame on him, and thus Mai gets off the hook. While Kuze does not really believe this, he concedes to this single defeat, though does not want to easily back down from the situation. Another small direct involvement related to Jun is at the beginning of Kanons story when he is the one that first spots Shiori Misaka standing outside in the snow during school.

Voiced by: Hiroshi Kamiya (2002 anime/drama CD), Kenji Nojima (2006 anime), Jay Hickman (English)
Kuze is the student council president at Yuichi's school. He tends to be very full of himself and enjoys talking down to people such as Mai Kawasumi due to his standing in the school. He has a rather small role in the story, appearing during Mai's story in order to warn her not to do anything to wreck the dance party she attended with Yuichi and Sayuri Kurata. Kuze has shown himself to have an angry temper, as he did not hesitate to yell at Mai at the end of the dance party when most of the inside of the building had been destroyed, despite her not being the main cause of the trouble.

Kuze's main involvement in the story is during Mai Kawasumi's arc. He first appears at the ballroom dance party where he warns Mai that if she does anything out of line that he will find some way to expel her for sure. Unfortunately for Mai, one of the demons attack the dance party early on, and Kuze immediately tries to get her expelled for what transpired, despite her not being the main cause of the damage. After Jun Kitagawa gets Mai off the hook, Kuze does not easily want to back down, and tries to threaten Sayuri Kurata, telling her that the next time Mai causes trouble, Sayuri will not go unpenalized for covering for Mai. Before he can finish, however, Mai tells him that she will never forgive him if he harms Sayuri in any way. Kuze gets intimidated by Mai, and leaves. He does not appear in the story after this point.

Piro is a stray Siamese cat that Nayuki finds first and, despite her allergies, adores. Makoto, after an incident where she feels that keeping a pet is cruel because the pet always gets abandoned, loses the cat on purpose and then promptly searches until she finds it, having felt sorry for what she did. Makoto finally takes the cat home to the Minase house. After Yuichi jokes about calling it "Nikuman" because of Makoto's fondness for meat buns, Nayuki decides that a food name is a great idea, and Yuichi suggests "Piroshiki", a transliteration of the Russian word for meat bun. Makoto calls the cat "Piro" for short, even though she does not know the true meaning of the word. When Piro is with Makoto, the cat usually rests on Makoto's head. After Piro is lost near the end of Makoto's story, it comes back to the Minase house.

Kazuya was Sayuri's younger brother. He had a shy personality and his body was weak from an early age; Sayuri had always been strict with him as her parents had been with her, so she never played with him and always attempted to toughen him up due to his physical weakness. But she felt so bad for him at the hospital, that she made an exception for once. He died in the hospital after playing with his sister for the first and last time. Upon his death, Sayuri's strict father shows a more tender side to his personality, expressing his gratitude for his daughter ensuring that Kazuya was happy in his final moments.

References

External links
Official Kanon visual novel character profiles 

Characters
Lists of anime and manga characters
Kanon